Cryptops sometimes known as cave centipedes, is a centipede genus in the family Cryptopidae; species records have a world-wide distribution.

Species
The Global Biodiversity Information Facility includes:

Cryptops acapulcensis Verhoeff, 1934
Cryptops aelleni Demange, 1963
Cryptops aernarienis Verhoeff, 1943
Cryptops afghanus Loksa, 1971
Cryptops africanus Lawrence, 1955
Cryptops agilis Meinert, 1868
Cryptops aloysiisabaudiae Silvestri, 1907
Cryptops andinensis González-Sponga, 2006
Cryptops angolensis Machado, 1951
Cryptops annectus Chamberlin, 1947
Cryptops annexus Chamberlin, 1962
Cryptops anomalans Newport, 1844
Cryptops arapuni Archey, 1922
Cryptops argentinus Bücherl, 1953
Cryptops armatus Silvestri, 1899
Cryptops attemsi Demange, 1963
Cryptops audax Attems, 1928
Cryptops australis Newport, 1845
Cryptops basilewskyi Matic & Darabantu, 1977
Cryptops bayoni Silvestri, 1910
Cryptops beebei Chamberlin, 1924
Cryptops beroni Matic & Stavropoulos, 1988
Cryptops beshkovi Matic & Stavropoulos, 1988
Cryptops bivittatus Pocock, 1893
Cryptops bokumensis Kraus, 1958
Cryptops bottegii Silvestri, 1897
Cryptops brachyraphe Verhoeff, 1934
Cryptops brignolii Matic, 1977
Cryptops brunneus Chamberlin R., 1921
Cryptops burenius Verhoeff, 1940
Cryptops calinus Chamberlin, 1957
Cryptops camoowealensis Edgecombe, 2006
Cryptops campestris Attems, 1952
Cryptops canariensis Latzel, 1895
Cryptops capensis Lewis, 2013-02
Cryptops caucasius Verhoeff, 1934
Cryptops cavernicolus Negrea & Fundora Martinez, 1977
Cryptops coiffati Demange, 1968
Cryptops compositus Chamberlin, 1952
Cryptops corcyraeus Verhoeff, 1901
Cryptops cornifer Chamberlin, 1918
Cryptops covertus Chamberlin, 1951
Cryptops crassipes Silvestri, 1895
Cryptops croaticus Verhoeff, 1931
Cryptops cubanus Matic, Negrea & Fundora Martinez, 1977
Cryptops danhomenou Brolemann, 1926
Cryptops daszaki Lewis, 2002
Cryptops debilis Bücherl, 1950
Cryptops decoratus Lawrence, 1960
Cryptops dentipes Lawrence, 1960
Cryptops detectus Silvestri, 1899
Cryptops dianae Matic & Stavropoulos, 1990
Cryptops dilagus Archey, 1921
Cryptops doriae Pocock, 1891
Cryptops dubiotarsalis Bücherl, 1946
Cryptops echinipes Lawrence, 1955
Cryptops erkowiti Lewis, 1967
Cryptops ethophor Chamberlin, 1920
Cryptops eutypus Chamberlin, 1951
Cryptops feae Pocock R.I., 1891
Cryptops fitzsimonsi Lawrence, 1959
Cryptops floridanus Chamberlin, 1925
Cryptops frater Chamberlin, 1962
Cryptops fur Meinert, 1886
Cryptops furciferens Chamberlin, 1921
Cryptops galatheae Meinert, 1886
Cryptops garganensis Verhoeff, 1934
Cryptops gigas Kraepelin, 1903
Cryptops goiasus Chamberlin, 1958
Cryptops gracilimus Machado, 1951
Cryptops gynnis Chamberlin, 1956
Cryptops haasei Attems, 1903
Cryptops heathi Chamberlin, 1914
Cryptops hephaestus Ázara & Ferreira, 2013-09
Cryptops hispanus Brolemann, 1920
Cryptops hortensis Donovan, 1810
Cryptops iheringi Brölemann, 1902
Cryptops illyricus Verhoeff, 1933
Cryptops incertus Attems, 1937
Cryptops indicus [no auth]
Cryptops inermipes Pocock, 1888
Cryptops iporangensis Ázara & Ferreira, 2013-09
Cryptops iucundus Würmli, 1972
Cryptops japonicus Takakuwa, 1934
Cryptops jeanneli Matic, 1960
Cryptops kafbuensis Goffinet, 1971
Cryptops kafubuensis Goffinet, 1971
Cryptops kalobensis Goffinet, 1971
Cryptops kempi Silvestri, 1924
Cryptops kivuensis Lawrence, 1953
Cryptops kosswigi Chamberlin, 1952
Cryptops lamprethus Chamberlin, 1920
Cryptops lapidicolus Matic, Negrea & Fundora Martinez, 1977
Cryptops legagus Edgecombe, Akkari, Netherlands & Du Preez, 2020
Cryptops leucopodus Rafinesque, 1820
Cryptops libriceps Attems, 1952
Cryptops livius Chamberlin, 1951
Cryptops lobatus Verhoeff, 1931
Cryptops longicornis Ribaut, 1915
Cryptops longipes Goux, 1950
Cryptops loveridgei Lawrence, 1953
Cryptops malabarensis Balan, Sureshan & Khanna, 2012
Cryptops malaccanus Verhoeff, 1937
Cryptops manni Chamberlin, 1915
Cryptops martinicensis Schileyko, Iorio & Coulis, 2018
Cryptops mauritianus Verhoeff, 1939
Cryptops medius Verhoeff, 1901
Cryptops megalopora Haase, 1887
Cryptops melanifer Chamberlin, 1955
Cryptops melanotypus Chamberlin, 1941
Cryptops micrus Chamberlin, 1922
Cryptops milloti Lawrence, 1960
Cryptops mirabilis Machado, 1951
Cryptops mirus Chamberlin, 1920
Cryptops modigliani Silvestri, 1895
Cryptops monilis Gervais, 1849
Cryptops monilisin Gervais, 1849
Cryptops nahuelbuta Chamberlin, 1955
Cryptops nanus Attems, 1938
Cryptops nautiphilus Chamberlin, 1939
Cryptops navigans Chamberlin, 1913
Cryptops navis Chamberlin, 1930
Cryptops neocaledonicus Ribaut, 1923
Cryptops nepalensis Lewis, 1999
Cryptops nigropictus Takakuwa, 1936
Cryptops nigropictus Verhoeff, 1936
Cryptops niloticus Lewis, 1967
Cryptops niuensis Chamberlin, 1920
Cryptops nivicomes Verhoeff, 1938
Cryptops notandus Silvestri, 1939
Cryptops numidicus Lucas, 1846
Cryptops omissus Ribaut, 1915
Cryptops orientalis Jangi, 1955
Cryptops orizaba Chamberlin, 1943
Cryptops osellai Matic, 1977
Cryptops parisi Brolemann, 1920
Cryptops patagonicus Meinert, 1886
Cryptops pauciporus Lawrence, 1955
Cryptops pauliani Lawrence, 1960
Cryptops pauperatus Attems, 1937
Cryptops penicillatus Lawrence, 1960
Cryptops peringueyi Attems, 1928
Cryptops persimilis Attems, 1943
Cryptops philammus Attems, 1928
Cryptops pictus Ribaut, 1923
Cryptops planquettei Demange, 1965
Cryptops polyodontus Attems, 1903
Cryptops pori Negrea, 1997
Cryptops positus Chamberlin, 1939
Cryptops propinquus Lawrence, 1960
Cryptops pugnans Chamberlin, 1922
Cryptops punicus Silvestri, 1896
Cryptops quadrisulcatus Demange, 1963
Cryptops relictus Chamberlin R., 1920
Cryptops religens Chamberlin & Wang, 1951
Cryptops rhodesianus Attems, 1928
Cryptops ribauti Demange, 1963
Cryptops riedeli Matic, Negrea & Fundora Martinez, 1977
Cryptops roeplainsensis Edgecombe, 2005
Cryptops rossi Chamberlin, 1955
Cryptops rouxi Ribaut, 1923
Cryptops royi Demange, 1963
Cryptops rucneri Matic, 1967
Cryptops ruficeps Pocock, 1894
Cryptops sankuruensis Schubart, 1938
Cryptops sarasini Ribaut, 1923
Cryptops schubarti Bücherl, 1953
Cryptops setosior Chamberlin, 1959
Cryptops similis Machado, 1953
Cryptops sinesicus Chamberlin, 1940
Cryptops socotrensis Pocock, 1903
Cryptops songi Song, Zhu & Liang, 2010
Cryptops spec Schileyko, Iorio & Coulis, 2018
Cryptops spelaeoraptor Ázara & Ferreira, 2014
Cryptops speleorex Vahtera, Stoev & Akkari, 2020
Cryptops spinipes Pocock, 1891
Cryptops stabilis Chamberlin, 1944
Cryptops sternalis Brolemann, 1926
Cryptops striatus Takakuwa, 1936
Cryptops stupendus Attems, 1928
Cryptops sublitoralis Verhoeff, 1931
Cryptops sulcipes Chamberlin, 1920
Cryptops sutteri Würmli, 1972
Cryptops tahitianus Chamberlin, 1920
Cryptops toumodiensis Demange, 1965
Cryptops triangulifer Verhoeff, 1937
Cryptops triserratus Attems, 1903
Cryptops trisulcatus Brolemann, 1902
Cryptops troglobius Matic Negrea & Fundora Martinez, 1977
Cryptops typhloporus Lawrence, 1955
Cryptops umbricus Verhoeff, 1931
Cryptops validus Meinert, 1886
Cryptops vanderplaetseni Demange, 1963
Cryptops vector Chamberlin, 1939
Cryptops venezuelae Chamberlin, 1939
Cryptops verdascens Goffinet, 1971
Cryptops vulcanicus Zapparoli, 1990
Cryptops watsingus Chamberlin, 1939

References

Centipede genera
 
Taxa named by William Elford Leach